The Maryknoll School of Lupon is located in Lupon, Davao Oriental, Philippines. It is a private
diocesan school that educates to secondary level.

Maryknoll is located in the south-eastern coast of Davao, serving the community of Lupon, Davao Oriental and surrounding town of Banaybanay and San Isidro. It is 130 kilometers away from Davao City.

Brief history

Maryknoll High School of Lupon is a prelature secondary school in the south-eastern coast of Davao, serving the community of Lupon, Davao Oriental and the surrounding town of Banaybanay and San Isidro. It is 130 kilometers away from Davao City.

The school was founded in 1960 by American missionary Fr. James Ferry of the Maryknoll Fathers. He named the school, St. Patrick’s High School. It initially started with four classrooms and 115 students. Through his efforts and the generous donations from his friends abroad, three offices and a stage were added to the original building with four classrooms.

Fr. Ferry was the first director of the school and Miss Elisa Santos, the first principal. She ran the school for four years and saw the first graduation of 31 students.

The Maryknoll Sisters assumed the administration of the school in July 1964. With the coming of the American Maryknoll Sisters, the progress of the school became rapid. The years within 1968 -1977 with Sister Loretta Harriman, MM as principal, witnessed the progress and growth of the school. Through her efforts, a spacious library and a laboratory were constructed for the benefit of the growing population. Good academic instruction and firm discipline became distinctive competencies
of the school.

Enrollment increased to 600 in the early 70s but the opening of Lupon Municipal High School and the Lupon Vocational High School less than a kilometer away from the school, reduced the enrollment considerably. Added to this factor was the growing unrest of the people due to the peace and order condition in the area.

The school year 1975-1976 was a period of transition in the administration of the school. The Maryknoll Sisters’ policy of phasing out from schools in the Philippines took effect and the administrative functions in school were left to layman.

Between the years 1976-1978, rapid succession of three lay principals took place.

In 1978 the administration of Maryknoll High school of Lupon was handed over to the Dominican Sisters of the Most Holy Rosary of the Philippines, with Sister Mary Epifania Brasil, O.P. as principal. The sisters responded to the invitation of Msgr. Joseph Regan, MM Bishop of Tagum to administer the school left by the Maryknoll Sisters to the Filipino Administrators. Sister Brasil showed great concern and involvement towards the improvement of the school facilities, buildings as well as the development of the faculty members and the students.

In 1984 the administration was assumed by another Dominican Sister, Sr. Ma. Antonina Paguntalan, O.P., with all the efforts and interest to go on the mission to improve the school and its facilities, she made additional projects for the benefit of the whole student body.

In 1989 the school was run by another sister of Dominican Order, Sr. Mary Visitacion Nuñez, O.P.. During her first two years at Maryknoll, she has contributed other improvements In school such as the construction of the additional classroom, guest room, and the installation of intercom in every classroom as part of communication gadgets and renovation of offices.

After three years, in 1992, Sister Ma. Teofila Frondozo, O.P. assumed office as a new principal of Maryknoll School of Lupon. Under her administration, the school began to offer computer to the students, construction of a four-door school dormitory, and construction of back fence which collapsed due to flash flood.
In June 1996 another Dominican Sister, Sr. Ma. Evelyn M. Oqueza, O.P. took over the administration. Improvements and renovations were made such as repainting of the school building, construction of carpentry shop and the completion of the reading center initiated by MOLSAC. It was in her administration that the school had changed its name from “Maryknoll High School” to Maryknoll School of Lupon and the Elementary Department was recognized by the Department of Education.

In June 2000 Sister Ma. Domitilla Sendino, O.P., another Dominican Sister took over for one year. She managed the completion of Speech Laboratory and acquisition of a photo copying machine.

In June 2001 the school is administered and managed by another Dominican Sister, Sister Ma. Amata I. Iturralde, O.P. until May 30, 2005. In her administration, the school enjoyed series of improvements such as acquisition of additional computer and sports equipment, renovation of Science Laboratory, restrooms, constructions of drinking water facilities (flowing), new gate, canals, new guardhouse, students’ path walk, kiosk, concretization of fence near the convent, acquisition of other equipment such as Riso Copier and Sound Systems.  With the support of the PTA organization, Sr. Amata was able to realize her plans for development and maintenance of the school, enhance the skills and knowledge of its faculty and innovate school instructions.

Much more, she was able to put up additional funds in the PERAA (Private Educational Retirement Annuity Association) Plan for the security of teaching and non-teaching staffs’ tenure in the school.

In June 2005  Sr. Ma. Myrle P. Gudilosao, O.P, another Dominican Sister took over to manage the school. She compiled the three years institutional plan of Sr. Ma. Amata I. Iturralde, O.P.. In her administration, the school provides for the increase of number of days pay for employees from 21.8 to 30 days, in spite of the budget constraints, she was able to manage for the renovation and transfer of finance offices accessible to the parents and visitors; construction of new Guidance and Prefect of Discipline’s offices; conversion of old dormitory into function hall; tile flooring of offices and faculty room; construction of new canteen building; new faculty and students CR; acquisition of Yamaha amplifier, procurement of three brand new computer units with complete accessories for offices and faculty use, library books, new athletic and DBC equipment, library expansion with new arrangement and acquisition of brand new L-300 cab/chassis vehicle. With her inspiration, the school responded the invitation of neighboring school’s challenges in different field of endeavor in the field of Academic, Athletic and DBC competition and garnered result with flying colors. Although there were some loop holes encountered but was able to manage the situation.

In the school year 2007-2008, with Sister Myrle’s leadership Maryknoll School of Lupon participated in the DCSAA (Diocesan Catholic Schools Athletic Association) held at Sigaboy, San Isidro, Davao Oriental, a neighboring town of Lupon. The school rank second in the overall result of the said athletic competition.

Installation of new Electrical Transformer, which aims to regulate the correct flow of electrical voltage used by the school and purchasing of twenty (20) brand new computer units are the recent projects of Sr. Ma. Myrle P. Gudilosao, O.P.

References

Catholic secondary schools in the Philippines
Educational institutions established in 1960
Schools in Davao Oriental
1960 establishments in the Philippines
Maryknoll schools
Dominican schools